Allan Estuardo Rodríguez Reyes (19 October 1981) is a Guatemalan politician from the Vamos party who was president of the Congress of the Republic of Guatemala for two periods, from 2020 to 2022.

References 

1981 births
Living people
Presidents of the Congress of Guatemala
Vamos (Guatemala) politicians